Maverick "Mav" Stevens (born Steve Mavridis, 29 November 1982, Wollongong, Australia) is a guitarist who played as a guest with the Australian heavy metal band Dungeon and was a member of the related band Lord.  He is the cousin of Tim Yatras who played drums in Lord.

On 23 December 2006 at a local metal festival, Hail and Kill, Stevens announced that he would be leaving Lord and moving to the United Kingdom due to personal reasons, he departed Australia on 4 May 2007.

Discography

Other appearances
 Dungeon - The Final Chapter (guest guitar, October 2006)
 Simon Polhill – Serial – guitars, backing vocals (EP, June 2007)
 L.U.S.T. - Self-Titled EP (EP, 2007)
 Shotgun Wedding - That's All Ya Gettin (EP, 2007)

References

External links
 Profile at MySpace

Australian guitarists
1982 births
Living people
People from Wollongong
21st-century guitarists